is a Japanese athlete competing in the 3000 metres steeplechase. She represented her country at the 2016 Summer Olympics, but did not qualify for the final.

International competitions

Personal bests
Outdoor
1500 metres – 4:25.61 (Shibetsu 2015)
3000 metres steeplechase – 9:44.22 (Nagoya 2016)
Indoor
3000 metres – 9:44.58 (Doha 2016)

References

External links 
  
 
 

Living people
1996 births
Japanese female steeplechase runners
Olympic female steeplechase runners
Olympic athletes of Japan
Athletes (track and field) at the 2016 Summer Olympics
Japan Championships in Athletics winners